MGR Magan is a 2021 Indian Tamil-language masala film directed by Ponram and produced by Screen Scene Media Entertainment Pvt Ltd. The film stars M. Sasikumar, Sathyaraj and Mirnalini Ravi in lead roles and the music is composed by Anthony Daasan. It was released on 4 November 2021 on Disney+ Hotstar and opened to mostly negative reviews from critics and became a commercial failure.

Plot
 Naturopathy practitioner, MG Ramasamy's relationship with his son turns sour, but the duo must reunite in order to save a medicinal mountain from the claws of a cunning businessman.

Cast

Production 
The principal photography of the film began on 25 September 2019 and the initial schedule of the film was shot in Theni. Mirnalini Ravi who debuted in Super Deluxe was cast in the film as the female lead opposite to M. Sasikumar. Initially Sathyaraj's role was offered to Rajkiran but he declined the offer due to the schedule conflicts. The shooting of the film completed at the end of November 2019.

Soundtrack 
The soundtrack and score is composed by Anthony Daasan. The soundtrack album featured four songs written by Yugabharathi, Murugan Manthiram and Anthony Daasan. The audio rights were acquired by Sony Music India.

Release

Streaming 
MGR Magan was cleared by the censor board on 28 August 2020. The film was initially planned for theatrical release on Diwali 2020, but was postponed due to the delay in theatres reopen from the COVID-19 pandemic in India. The trailer of the film was released on 14 November 2020. In late November 2020, the team was planning to push the film for the Christmas release but it didn't happen. Later the film makers announced the film will be released on 23 April 2021 with the 50% occupancy in the theatres but was forced to postpone the release again due to the new lockdown restrictions imposed by the Tamil Nadu government ahead of COVID-19-second wave in India. In October 2021, the theatrical release was cancelled in favour of a direct-to-streaming release on Disney+ Hotstar, on 4 November 2021.

Home Media 
The satellite rights of the film is sold to Star Vijay.

Reception
Vishal Menon of Film Companion wrote, "The father-son conflict in MGR Magan is neither pushed hard enough to make things funny nor does it succeed in creating tension." Siby Jeyya from India Herald wrote, "MGR Magan is a great family film that has a good mix of laughs, action, thrills, and emotions. If you look underneath the layer of comedy, it strives to convey a message, and even if the actors' delivery is a little sloppy at times, the concept finally catches up with you." Sify gave a rating of 2.5 out on 5 and wrote, "Ponram's 'MGR Magan' isn't bad. But it also doesn't provide us the kind of fun that his [Ponram] earlier films have made us expect of him." Avinash Ramachandran from Cinema Express gave a rating of 2 out on 5 and wrote, "MGR Magan manages to be is a rickety ride in a defunct carnival that had clearly seen better days."

References

External links 
 

2020s masala films
2020s Tamil-language films
2021 direct-to-video films
Disney+ Hotstar original films
Indian direct-to-video films
Films scored by Anthony Daasan